90-60-90 modelos (90-60-90 Models) is an Argentine 1996 telenovela, produced by Telearte. It was aired on January 8, 1996, on Canal 9 in Argentina. It had two seasons, in 1996 and 1997.

This is the story about beautiful women, who had to choose their own destiny. The main roles are portrayed by, Silvia Kutika, Raúl Taibo, Osvaldo Laport, Coraje Abalos and Natalia Oreiro 
The last episode included a parade, filmed in the Sheraton Hotel. The last episode was aired on July 4, and the telenovela was replaced by Los herederos del poder.

Cast

References

External links 
90-60-90 modelos at IMDb.
Intro 90-60-90 modelos

Argentine telenovelas
El Nueve original programming
1996 telenovelas
1996 Argentine television series debuts
1997 Argentine television series endings
Spanish-language telenovelas